Najib Cabinet is the name of either of two cabinets of Malaysia:
Cabinet Najib I (2009–2013)
Cabinet Najib II (2013–2018)